Kammertheater München, former known as Kammertheater Schwabing is a theatre in Munich, Bavaria, Germany.

External links 
 Website of the theatre (german)

Theatres in Munich